The US Market Access Center (abbreviated as USMAC),  located in Menlo Park, is a business accelerator and trade gateway into the United States for high-tech international companies. The USMAC specializes in US market entry for small to mid-sized, high-growth companies in the information and communications, clean technology, and the life sciences sectors planning to expand their marketing, sales and operations to the United States.

The USMAC was founded in 1995 as a joint venture of the San Jose State University Research Foundation and the City of San Jose's Redevelopment Agency.  The original name was the International Business Incubator (IBI).  Initially, the organization initially only offered furnished office space and virtual office services to international high-tech companies looking to enter the United States. When consulting services was added to its portfolio in 2003, the company changed its name to US Market Access Center to reflect the new focus. The organization, along with the San Jose BioCenter, the San Jose Software Business Cluster, and the San Jose Environmental Business Cluster, were part of the San Jose Redevelopment Agency Incubation Program.

In 2006, the US Market Access Center was named a Soft Landing International Incubator by the National Business Incubation Association (NBIA).

In October 2011, the Redevelopment Agency's incubator programs became the subject of a San Jose city government investigation led by City Councilman Sam Liccardo, following the discovery of a 2009 consulting report that had been commissioned, but never released to the council. In it, a consulting firm concluded that the city's incubation programs consumed millions in funding, but produced almost no jobs. The study also concluded that companies that did succeed after working with the USMAC tended to leave for other facilities. What the study missed was the fact that as an accelerator, the USMAC intentionally graduates successful companies out of the program and the facility.  This was not a weakness, but done by design.  In 2012, the City of San Jose and the San Jose State University Research Foundation elected to close the BioCenter and Environmental Business Cluster, but the USMAC remained open and continued to grow its operations.

Two years later, following the State of California terminating support for all of the Redevelopment Agencies in the state, the City of San Jose terminated its payment of the rent on the USMAC facility in San Jose (as required by its agreement with the university).  In the fall of 2013, the USMAC announced that it would be closing its San Jose facility.  In a letter to tenants, management stated that without financial support from the RDA, the facility in San Jose would be closed.  The USMAC has relocated its headquarters to Menlo Park.

In recent years, the USMAC has run major programs for:
 - Cap Digital (France)
 - Czech Invest
 - Enterprise Estonia
 - Enterprise Ireland
 - Eurotechnologies (Lille, France)
 - Japan External Trade Organization
 - Joint Innovation Center (Brno, Czech Republic)
 - Kaunas University of Technology (Lithuania)
 - National IT Promotion Agency of Korea
 - Republic of Poland
 - Singapore Infocom Development Authority
 - Tallinn Technical University (Estonia)

In addition to its headquarters in Menlo Park, the USMAC maintains a presence at RocketSpace, a leading accelerator in San Francisco.

References

External links
 US Market Access Center Homepage
 San Jose Redevelopment Agency Homepage

Organizations established in 1995
Business incubators of the United States
Science and technology in the San Francisco Bay Area
1995 establishments in California